John Andrew King (born May 10, 1964, in Birmingham, England) is a Barbadian politician and entertainer. He currently serves as a senator in the Senate of Barbados since January 2022. He has also served as a Member of Parliament for St Philip West.

Early life and education 
John Andrew King was born on May 10, 1964, in Birmingham to Barbadian parents. He attended Ebenezer primary school. After his primary education, he obtained a degree in Social Work from the University of the West Indies.

Career 
During the 2018 Barbadian general election, King ran for the House of Assembly of Barbados and was elected. He was elected through the Barbados Labour Party replacing David Estwick who was a Minister of Agriculture. In May 2018, he was appointed Minister of Creative Economy, Culture, and Sports in the Mia Mottley administration.

Honors 

 Barbados Service Medal

References 

Living people
People from Birmingham, West Midlands
Barbadian politicians
Members of the Senate of Barbados
Foreign Ministers of Barbados
Members of the Parliament of Barbados
Barbados Labour Party politicians
University of the West Indies alumni
1964 births